Teviot  may refer to:

People 
Baron Teviot
Earl of Teviot

Places

Australia 

Teviot, Queensland, a town in the Scenic Rim Region, Queensland
Teviot Brook, a river in the Scenic Rim Region, Queensland
Teviot Falls, Queensland
Teviot Creek Dam, Queensland
Teviot Range, Mountain range in Queensland, Australia

New Zealand 

Teviot, New Zealand
Teviot River, New Zealand

United Kingdom 

 River Teviot, Scotland, and associated Teviotdale and Teviothead placenames
Teviot Row House, Edinburgh the world's oldest student union building, run by Edinburgh University Students' Association

Other 

SS Teviot, a cargo ship in service with the Royal Mail Line from 1946–60